Frank Thomas Stanfield (25 February 1903 – 2 July 1967) was a Canadian businessman and Progressive Conservative Party politician who was twice elected Member of the Canadian Parliament for the Colchester—Hants riding in Nova Scotia (1945–53). He was the son of the Canadian politician Frank Stanfield and brother of Robert Lorne Stanfield.

Early life 
Stanfield was born in Truro, Nova Scotia, the son of the politician Frank Stanfield and Sarah Emma Thomas. His brother was Robert Lorne Stanfield. He was educated in Truro and at McGill University. In 1932, he married Elizabeth Matheson. Stanfield served as president of Stanfield's Limited. He was also a director for Sobeys.

Career 
Stanfield served two terms for the Progressive Conservative Party in the 20th and 21st Canadian Parliaments. His career background was in industry. He died in Truro, Nova Scotia, in 1967 at the age of 64.

Electoral Record

References 

1903 births
1967 deaths
Members of the House of Commons of Canada from Nova Scotia
People from Truro, Nova Scotia
Progressive Conservative Party of Canada MPs
McGill University alumni